The 2016–17 DePaul Blue Demons women's basketball team represented DePaul University during the 2016–17 NCAA Division I women's basketball season. The Blue Demons, led by 31st year head coach Doug Bruno, played their home games at the McGrath–Phillips Arena as members of the Big East Conference. They finished the season 27–8, 16–2 in Big East play to win the Big East regular season title. They advanced to the championship game of the Big East women's tournament where they lost to Marquette. They received an at-large bid to the NCAA women's tournament where they defeated Northern Iowa in the first round before losing to Mississippi State in the second round.

This was expected to be the Blue Demons' final season at McGrath–Phillips Arena. DePaul plans to move the women's team off campus, though still within its home city of Chicago, into the new Wintrust Arena, currently under construction at the McCormick Place convention center. The arena will also become home to the DePaul men's team.

In the February 3 game against St. John's, senior guard Brooke Schulte scored her 1,000th career point.

Previous season
The Blue Devils finished the 2015–16 season 27–9, 16–2 in Big East play to win the Big East regular season title. They advanced to the semifinals of the Big East women's tournament where they lost to St. John's. They received an at-large bid to the NCAA women's basketball tournament where defeated James Madison in the first round, Louisville in the second round before losing to Oregon State in the sweet sixteen.

Roster

Schedule

|-
!colspan=9 style="background:#00438c; color:#F10041;"| Exhibition

|-
!colspan=9 style="background:#00438c; color:#F10041;"| Non-conference regular season

|-
!colspan=9 style="background:#00438c; color:#F10041;"| Conference regular season

|-
!colspan=9 style="background:#00438c; color:#F10041;"| Big East Women's Tournament

|-
!colspan=9 style="background:#00438c; color:#F10041;"| NCAA Women's Tournament

Source:

Rankings

References

DePaul
DePaul Blue Demons women's basketball seasons
DePaul
Depaul
Depaul